Lygisma is a plant genus in the family Apocynaceae, first described as a genus in 1883. It is native to southern China, Indochina, Malaysia, and the Himalayas.

Species
 Lygisma angustifolia (Wight) Hook.f. - Himalayas
 Lygisma flavum (Ridl.) Kerr - Peninsular Malaysia
 Lygisma inflexum (Costantin) Kerr - Vietnam, Guangdong, Guangxi, Hainan 
 Lygisma nervosum Kerr - Thailand

References

External links

Asclepiadoideae
Apocynaceae genera